Michael Mayer (born 11 December 1971) is an electronic musician from Cologne, Germany. Mayer is a remixer, DJ and producer, and has released several singles on the Kompakt music label, working with founder Wolfgang Voigt. Mayer has also released music on Kompakt-related labels New Trance Atlantic and Kreisel 99.

Biography
Mayer was born and raised in Black Forest, Germany. At the age of 20, he moved to Cologne. With the help of Wolfgang and Reinhardt Voigt, he established Kompakt.

In 2003, he released a pair of mixes. The first was based on several releases in Kompakt's "Speicher" series, while the second was commissioned by London's Fabric series. The following year, Mayer released a second Speicher mix and finally delivered his long-promised debut album of productions.

Discography

Albums
 Neuhouse (1998)
 Immer (2002)
 Speicher CD1 (2003)
 Fabric 13 (2003)
 Speicher CD2 (2004)
 Touch (2004)
 Immer 2 (2006)
 Speicher CD3 (2007)
 Save the World (2007)
 Immer 3 (2010)
 Mantasy (2012)
 & (2016)
 DJ-Kicks (2017)
 Higher (2020)
 Connecting The Dots (2021)

Remixes
 Agoria - Sky Is Clear
 Miss Kittin - "Happy Violentine"
 Depeche Mode - "Precious"
 Pet Shop Boys - "Flamboyant"
 Thylacine - "Train"

References

External links
Michael Mayer RBMA video lecture session
Michael Mayer Profile at Resident Advisor
Discogs: Michael Mayer

German electronic musicians
German techno musicians
Remixers
Living people
Musicians from Cologne
1971 births
Electronic dance music DJs